Bonfrancesco Arlotti (died 7 January 1508) was a Roman Catholic prelate who served as Bishop of Reggio Emilia (1477–1508).

On 9 June 1477, Arlotti was appointed during the papacy of Pope Sixtus IV as Bishop of Reggio Emilia.
He served as Bishop of Reggio Emilia until his death on 7 January 1508.

References

External links and additional sources
 (for Chronology of Bishops) 
 (for Chronology of Bishops) 

15th-century Italian Roman Catholic bishops
16th-century Italian Roman Catholic bishops
Bishops appointed by Pope Sixtus IV
1508 deaths